Miloš Nikolić may refer to:
Miloš M. Nikolić, Professor at the University of Belgrade
Miloš Nikolić (footballer, born 1987), Serbian association football defender
Miloš Nikolić (footballer, born 1989), Serbian association football defender
Miloš Nikolić (footballer, born 1994), Serbian association football defender